Iceland competed at the 2004 Summer Olympics in Athens, Greece, from 13 to 29 August 2004. Icelandic athletes have competed at every Summer Olympic Games in the modern era since 1912, except for four occasions.

The National Olympic and Sports Association of Iceland sent a total of 26 athletes, 21 men and 5 women, to compete in 5 sports, including men's handball, the nation's only team-based sport at these Olympic games. Seven Icelandic athletes had previously competed in Sydney, including swimmer Örn Arnarson, who finished fourth in the men's 200 m backstroke. Handball player Guðmundur Hrafnkelsson, who competed in his third Olympics since 1988 and helped his team set a remarkable comeback to the Games after an eight-year absence, was appointed by the committee to become the nation's flag bearer in the opening ceremony.

Iceland failed to win an Olympic medal for the first time since 1996, although pole vaulter Þórey Edda Elísdóttir achieved a best result for the team at these Games with a fifth-place finish.

Athletics 

Icelandic athletes have so far achieved qualifying standards in the following athletics events (up to a maximum of 3 athletes in each event at the 'A' Standard, and 1 at the 'B' Standard).

Men
Combined events – Decathlon

Women
Field events

Gymnastics

Artistic
Men

Handball

Men's tournament

Roster

Group play

Ninth Place Final

Sailing

Open

M = Medal race; OCS = On course side of the starting line; DSQ = Disqualified; DNF = Did not finish; DNS= Did not start; RDG = Redress given

Swimming 

Icelandic swimmers earned qualifying standards in the following events (up to a maximum of 2 swimmers in each event at the A-standard time, and 1 at the B-standard 
time): 

Men

Women

See also
 Iceland at the 2004 Summer Paralympics

References

External links
Official Report of the XXVIII Olympiad
National Olympic and Sports Association of Iceland 

Nations at the 2004 Summer Olympics
2004 Summer Olympics
Summer Olympics